Liao, King of Wu (died 515 BC), also named Zhouyu, was king of the state of Wu in the Spring and Autumn period.

Biography
Liao was the grandson of King Shoumeng. He took the throne in 526 BC. During his time as king he led several battles against the state of Chu. In 518 BC, he conquered the fortified Chu city of Zhongli. He was assassinated by Zhuan Zhu during a function organised by his cousin, Prince Guang, who then became King Helü of Wu.

References

Works cited 

 

515 BC deaths
Chinese kings
Zhou dynasty nobility
Year of birth unknown
Monarchs of Wu (state)
6th-century BC murdered monarchs
Assassinated Chinese politicians